The 1994 Michigan Attorney General election was held on November 8, 1994. Incumbent Democrat Frank J. Kelley defeated Republican nominee John Smietanka with 57.41% of the vote.

General election

Candidates
Major party candidates
Frank J. Kelley, Democratic
John Smietanka, Republican

Results

References

Attorney General
Michigan Attorney General elections
November 1994 events in the United States
Michigan